Cabrakan (also known as Caprakan) was a Mayan god of earthquakes and mountains. He is the son of Vucub-Caquix and is mentioned in the Popul vuh.

He has been called the Maya equivalent to Tepēyōllōtl.

In popular culture, he is a playable character in Smite. He is also an antagonist in Maya and the Three.

References 

Maya gods
Earthquake myths
Characters from the Popol Vuh